Molecular Psychiatry is a peer-reviewed scientific journal published by Nature Publishing Group.
It covers research in biological psychiatry.

Abstracting and indexing 
The journal is abstracted and indexed in:

According to the Journal Citation Reports, Molecular Psychiatry had an impact factor of 13.437 in 2021, ranking it 6th among 156 journals in the category "Psychiatry", 6th among 273 journals in the category "Neuroscience", and 11th among 298  journals in the category "Biochemistry & Molecular Biology".

See also

 List of psychiatry journals
 Translational Psychiatry, its sister journal

References

External links
 

Neuroscience journals
Psychiatry journals
Publications established in 1997
English-language journals
Nature Research academic journals
Monthly journals
Abnormal psychology journals